Shiga at-large district is a constituency in the House of Councillors of Japan, the upper house of the Diet of Japan (national legislature). It currently elects 2 members to the House of Councillors, 1 per election. The current representatives are:

 Takashi Koyari, first elected in 2016. Term ends in 2022. Member of the Liberal Democratic Party.
 Yukiko Kada, first elected in 2019. Term ends in 2025. Member of the Hekisuikai parliamentary group.
The district contains 1,154,108 eligible voters as of September 2020.

References 

Districts of the House of Councillors (Japan)